The Chinese paddlefish (Psephurus gladius; : literal translation: "white sturgeon"), also known as the Chinese swordfish, is an extinct species of fish that was formerly native to the Yangtze and Yellow River basins in China. It was the only species in the genus Psephurus and one of two recent species of paddlefish (Polyodontidae), the other being the American paddlefish (Polyodon spathula). It was an anadromous species, meaning that it spent part of its adult life at sea, while migrating upriver to spawn.

The Chinese paddlefish was officially declared extinct in 2022, with an estimated time of extinction to be by 2005, and no later than 2010, although it had become functionally extinct by 1993. The main cause of its extinction was the construction of the Gezhouba and Three Gorges dams, causing population fragmentation and blocking the anadromous spawning migration. Overfishing also played a significant role in its demise. Fishing of the Chinese paddlefish dates back centuries, with annual harvests reaching 25 tons by the 1970s. Since the 1990s, the species was officially listed by the International Union for Conservation of Nature (IUCN) as critically endangered, and was last seen alive in 2003. A 2019 paper including scientists from the Yangtze River Fisheries Research Institute found the species to be extinct. It was unanimously agreed to be extinct by the Species Survival Commission Sturgeon Specialist Group of the IUCN on 15 September 2019, with its conservation status being formally updated by the IUCN Red List in July 2022.

Description

The Chinese paddlefish had a white underbelly, and its back and head were grey. Its dorsal and anal fins were situated considerably far back on the body. The paddle-like rostrum was narrow and pointed, and was between a quarter and up to a third of total body length. Its eyes were small and round. The tail fin was heterocercal (spine extending into the upper lobe), with the lower lobe being well developed. The skull is more elongate and narrower than that of the American paddlefish, and lacks the sculpturing present on the skull bones of other paddlefish, with the stellate (star-shaped) bones on the rostrum less numerous than those of the American paddlefish. The teeth were small, sharp, canine shaped and inward curling, and became proportionally smaller relative to the jaw during growth, and in mature adults were completely fused the bone. Compared to Polyodon, the jaws were shorter, and had a proportionately narrower gape, and unlike the American paddlefish, but similar to fossil paddlefish, the upper jaw was not firmly attached to the braincase. Like other paddlefish, the skeleton was largely cartilaginous. The body lacked scales, except for small scales in the caudal peduncle and caudal fin.

Ping recorded that fishermen in Nanjing caught a Chinese paddlefish with a length of 7 meters and a weight of 907 kilograms.

Taxonomy and evolutionary history

The species was first named as a species of Polyodon by Eduard von Martens in 1862. It was placed into a separate, monotypic genus by Albert Günther in 1873. The species was also given a different name, Spatularia angustifolium by Johann Jakob Kaup also in 1862, but this is considered a junior synonym of P. gladius.

Paddlefish (Polyodontidae) are one of two living families of Acipenseriformes alongside sturgeons (Acipenseridae). The oldest records of Acipenseriformes date to the Early Jurassic, over 190 million years ago. The oldest paddlefish fossil is that of Protopsephurus from the Early Cretaceous of China, dating to around 120 million years ago. The oldest representatives of the genus containing the American paddlefish (Polyodon) date to around 65 million years ago, from the beginning of the Paleocene. Various molecular clock estimates have been given for the age of the divergence between the American and Chinese paddlefish, including 68 million years ago 72 million years ago, and 100 million years ago, all dating to the middle to Upper Cretaceous.

Relationships of recent and fossil paddlefish genera, after Grande et al. (2002).

Distribution, habitat and ecology

The Chinese paddlefish was native to the Yangtze (Chang Jiang) River basin and its estuary at the East China Sea. Historically it was also recorded in the Yellow River basin (which is connected to the Yangtze by the Grand Canal) and its estuary at the Yellow Sea.  It primarily inhabited the large rivers, but sometimes travelled into large lakes. Due to their anadromous nature, mature individuals were found in coastal waters of the East China Sea and the Yellow Sea; occasionally spring tides would bring individuals into the lower reaches of the Qiantang and Yong rivers of Zhejiang province.

The species spent part of its life in the lower section of the Yangtze, including the brackish water of its estuary, but migrated upriver and into major tributaries to congregate for spawning, which occurred in spring, from mid-March to early April. A study on a sample of spawning Chinese paddlefish found that they were 8 to 12 years old. The developing zygotes and fry were restricted to the region of the Yangtze basin upstream of Luzhou in southeastern Sichuan, while yearlings and adults were widely distributed throughout the Yangtze river proper from the lower to upper reaches.

The fish was largely solitary, and occupied the lower-mid layers of the water column. Chinese paddlefish were noted for being strong swimmers. Unlike its relative the American paddlefish, which is a planktivorous filter feeder, the Chinese paddlefish was primarily piscivorous, mainly feeding on small to medium-sized fishes like anchovies (Coilia), cyprinids (Coreius, Rhinogobio), gobies (Gobius) as well as bagrid catfish and bothid flounders. Shrimp and crab were also eaten. The jaws, unlike the American paddlefish but like sturgeons and fossil paddlefish, were capable of protrusion, a form of cranial kinesis allowing them to move relative to the rest of the skull, with the upper jaw being able to thrust downwards and forwards in order to seize prey. Paddlefish, like other Acipenseriformes and several other groups of vertebrates, engage in passive electroreception (the sensing of external electric fields) using structures called ampullae that form an extension of the lateral line system of sensory organs. Passive electroreception (where electric fields are sensed but not generated, as in electric fish) is primarily used for detecting the weak electric fields generated by prey. The head and rostrum of Chinese paddlefish, like those of other paddlefish, was densely packed with ampullae, indicating that enhancing electroreception was one of the rostrum's primary functions.

Decline and extinction
The last records of Chinese paddlefish in the Yellow River basin and its estuary date back to the 1960s, although declines were realized between the 13th and 19th centuries. Declines were significant throughout its primary range in the Yangtze basin, but annual captures of 25 tonnes continued into the 1970s. In 1983, the Chinese government made fishing of the species illegal due to its decline in numbers. The species was still being found in small numbers in the 1980s (for example, 32 were caught in 1985), and young were seen as recently as 1995. Due to the rarity of the fish by the time it was realised that it was in peril, and the fact that the adult fish were difficult to keep in captivity, attempts to create a captive breeding stock failed.

During a search conducted in the Yangtze basin from 2006–2008, a research team from the Chinese Academy of Fisheries Science in Jingzhou failed to catch any paddlefish, but two possible specimens were recorded with hydroacoustic signals. A comprehensive study published in 2019, including scientists from the Yangtze River Fisheries Research Institute, found that the species was certainly extinct, based on its absence from extensive capture surveys of the Yangtze between 2017 and 2018. The paper estimated that the species went extinct between 2005 and 2010, and became functionally extinct by 1993. The primary cause of its extinction was overfishing and the construction of dams along the Yangtze. The paddlefish was heavily overfished in all stages of growth from fry (which were easily captured by traditional fishing methods) to adult, which combined with the long generation time due to its slow maturation led to reduced sustainability of viable populations. Dam construction, notably the Gezhouba Dam, which became operational in 1981, and the Three Gorges Dam landlocked and divided populations and prevented the spawning migration. The paper thus recommended the reclassification of the species as Extinct by the IUCN. A similar recommendation was also made by the Species Survival Commission Sturgeon Specialist Group of the IUCN in September 2019.

The official IUCN status of the species was formally updated to "extinct" in July 2022.

See also

 Baiji, a species of river dolphin also native to the Yangtze, which became extinct around the same time as the Chinese paddlefish and due to the same factors
 List of endangered and protected species of China

References

External links
 
 Article on the extinction in Qilu Yidian, which contains numerous rare images of the fish alive or recently dead

Brackish water organisms
Endemic fauna of China
Fish described in 1862
Fish extinctions since 1500
Freshwater fish of China
Extinct animals of China
Polyodontidae
Yangtze River